Cadwalader Heights is a neighborhood located within the city of Trenton in Mercer County, New Jersey, United States. The neighborhood was designed by Frederick Law Olmsted and primarily consists of detached, single-family homes built from 1907 to 1930. Cadwalader Heights is just southeast of Cadwalader Park.

References

Neighborhoods in Trenton, New Jersey